Richard Wilfred Hill (born 20 September 1963) is an English football coach and manager. He is also a former footballer who played for Oxford United, Watford, Northampton Town and Leicester City. He has been assistant manager at six different clubs, including Queens Park Rangers, and had a difficult but successful stint as manager of Stevenage Borough before taking Eastleigh into the Conference for the first time in their history.

Playing career
During his playing days Hill played for Nuneaton Borough, Christchurch United in New Zealand, Northampton Town, Watford and Oxford United. In his time at Northampton, Hill scored 33 league and cup goals in one season, winning the golden boot for finishing as the club's top goal scorer.

Hill was transferred from Northampton Town to Watford for a Fourth Division record fee of £258,000. He was the last signing made by Graham Taylor before his departure from Watford to manage Aston Villa at the end of the 1986–87 season. He did not feature in the plans of incoming manager Dave Bassett and consequently, his stay at Vicarage Road was brief only appearing 4 times: he was transferred to Oxford United for £260,000.

Hill had to finish his playing career early due to a serious knee injury, but having amassed 69 goals from just 171 Football League games.

Managerial career
Since retiring from playing Hill has been assistant manager to John Gregory at both Wycombe Wanderers and Queens Park Rangers, Brian Little at Aston Villa,  Martin Wilkinson at Northampton Town, Andy Hessenthaler at Gillingham, Tranmere Rovers and was first-team coach at Reading. He has also coached at Swindon Town, scouted for Derby County and managed Stevenage Borough.

In June 2010, Hill was appointed technical advisor to the Ethiopia national football team and worked with them during African Nations qualifying games.

In June 2011, Hill was appointed assistant manager to FC Kairat in the Kazakhstan Premier League.

On 12 September 2012, Hill was appointed manager of Conference South club Eastleigh. In his first season, he led Eastleigh to the Conference South Play Off Semi Finals. At the start of the 2013–14 season Eastleigh were big favourites to win the league. Under HIll's guidance he led Eastleigh to the Conference South title and promotion in the 2013–14 season. The 2014–15 season saw Eastleigh in the Conference Premier, the highest level of football the club had ever competed at, with Hill taking Eastleigh to the Play Off Semi Finals at the end of that season. During his initial spell as manager of Eastleigh, Hill achieved a win ratio of 62%.

Hill resigned at Eastleigh on 23 September 2015 after just over 3 years in the job, following a run of five games without a win, culminating in a 5–2 defeat to Dover Athletic. Leaving the club, Hill said it felt like a break-up, and it was time for a change for both himself and the club.

On 9 September 2016, Hill returned to management, replacing Pablo Asensio as boss of National League South club Whitehawk.

On 29 November 2016 Hill left Whitehawk and joined Aston Villa to be part of Steve Bruce's recruitment staff. Following the departure of Martin Allen as manager at Eastleigh, after a run of seven games without a win, Hill returned to The Spitfires as Director of Football and caretaker manager on 23 February 2017.

References

1963 births
Living people
Footballers from Leicestershire
English footballers
Association football forwards
Leicester City F.C. players
Nuneaton Borough F.C. players
Northampton Town F.C. players
Watford F.C. players
Oxford United F.C. players
Kettering Town F.C. players
English Football League players
English football managers
Stevenage F.C. managers
Whitehawk F.C. managers
Eastleigh F.C. managers
National League (English football) managers
Wycombe Wanderers F.C. non-playing staff
Aston Villa F.C. non-playing staff
Queens Park Rangers F.C. non-playing staff
Gillingham F.C. non-playing staff
Northampton Town F.C. non-playing staff
Tranmere Rovers F.C. non-playing staff
Swindon Town F.C. non-playing staff
Derby County F.C. non-playing staff